Trygonoptera is a genus of round rays endemic to the waters around Australia.  Müller and Henle defined Trygonoptera in 1841. It has often been considered synonymous with Urolophus, but this has been refuted by recent studies. Trygonoptera can be distinguished from Urolophus in that the outer rims of its nostrils are enlarged into broad, flattened lobes; the two also differ in aspects of the skeleton.

Species
There are currently six recognized species in this genus:
 Trygonoptera galba Last & Yearsley, 2008 (Yellow shovelnose stingaree)
 Trygonoptera imitata Yearsley, Last & M. F. Gomon, 2008 (Eastern shovelnose stingaree)
 Trygonoptera mucosa Whitley, 1939 (Western shovelnose stingaree)
 Trygonoptera ovalis Last & M. F. Gomon, 1987 (Striped stingaree)
 Trygonoptera personata Last & M. F. Gomon, 1987 (Masked stingaree)
 Trygonoptera testacea J. P. Müller & Henle, 1841 (Common stingaree)

References

 
Ray genera
 
Taxa named by Johannes Peter Müller
Taxa named by Friedrich Gustav Jakob Henle
Taxonomy articles created by Polbot